Amin Jahan Kohan is an Iranian football midfielder who currently plays for the Iranian football club Foolad.

Club career

Foolad
Jahan Kohan started his career with Foolad Academy. In winter 2011, he was placed on the first team by Majid Jalali. He made his debut for Foolad on January 11, 2012 against Mes Sarcheshmeh as a substitute for Hakim Nassari. In summer 2014 he joined Fajr Sepasi to spend his conscription period. In summer 2015 he moved to Malvan to continue his conscription in Persian Gulf Pro League. In winter 2016 he rejoined Foolad and #28 assigned for him.

Club career statistics

International career

Youth
He played two marches at the 2010 AFC U-16 Championship. He was also part of the U-20 team during the 2012 AFC U-19 Championship.

Honours
Foolad
Iran Pro League (1): 2013–14

References

External links
 Ahmad Abdollahzadeh at IranLeague.ir

1993 births
Living people
People from Ahvaz
Iranian footballers
Association football midfielders
Foolad FC players
Fajr Sepasi players
Khooshe Talaei players
Malavan players
Iran under-20 international footballers
Sportspeople from Khuzestan province